"Nothing Else Matters" is a song by American heavy metal band Metallica. It was released in 1992 as the third single from their self-titled fifth studio album, Metallica. The song peaked at number 11 on the Billboard Mainstream Rock Tracks chart, number 6 on the UK Singles Chart, number 1 in Denmark, and reached the top ten on many other European charts. "Nothing Else Matters" was featured as a playable track in the music video game Guitar Hero: Metallica. Recognized as one of Metallica's best known and most popular songs, the power ballad has become a staple in live performances.

History
Lead singer and rhythm guitarist James Hetfield wrote the song (credited to Hetfield/Ulrich) in 1990 while on tour, when Hetfield "was bumming out about being away from home." Initially, the song was not meant to be released, as Hetfield had written it for himself, but after drummer Lars Ulrich heard it, it was considered for the album. Hetfield initially had reservations about presenting the song to the band: "I thought that Metallica could only be the four of us. These are songs about destroying things, head banging, bleeding for the crowd, whatever it is, as long as it wasn't about chicks and fast cars, even though that's what we liked. The song was about a girlfriend at the time. It turned out to be a pretty big song." It was one of four demo songs recorded by the band on August 13, 1990.

Composition
 
Its intro is an E minor arpeggio (transposed one half-step lower on stage performances) beginning with the open low E followed by the open G, B and high E strings.

It is one of the few Metallica songs in which Hetfield plays the guitar solo. Guitarist Kirk Hammett does not play on the studio recording, making it one of the few in the whole Metallica repertoire, along with Cliff Burton's "(Anesthesia) Pulling Teeth", in which he does not appear.  Hammett stated he did not learn how to play the song until they were well into the tour for the album.

The orchestral arrangements were written by award-winning composer Michael Kamen, who would later go on to collaborate with the group on S&M.

Music video
The music video premiered on MTV on February 26, 1992. It was directed by Adam Dubin and edited by Sean Fullan. The clip consists of parts of the A Year and a Half in the Life of Metallica documentary, which was shot during the recordings of Metallica. One of them shows Hetfield playing a Gibson EDS-1275 guitar during the second chorus. MTV will not air the video during daytime hours anymore because it features nudity in the form of pin-up posters and Playboy centerfolds that are taped up in the studio. It also has a picture of Winger's Kip Winger which Ulrich is seen throwing darts at. On the band's 2006 music video compilation DVD, the posters are censored, as was done with the nudity featured in the music videos for "Turn the Page" and "Whiskey in the Jar".

In August 2021, the music video hit one billion views on YouTube, making it Metallica's first music video to do so.

Live
The song has now become a staple in Metallica's live performances, and has been dedicated to their fans. 

A live version in which this can be heard can be found on the CD/DVD Orgullo, Pasión y Gloria: Tres Noches en la Ciudad de México. Other live recordings can be found on Live Shit: Binge & Purge, on S&M, Cunning Stunts DVD, the DVD/Blu-ray The Big 4 Live from Sofia, Bulgaria as well as on the soundtrack for the band's feature film Through the Never, and also featured on 2019 S&M follow-up live album, S&M2.

Track listing

 This version was released in Europe April 27, 1992, and it contained the three songs Metallica played at the Freddie Mercury Tribute Concert on April 20, 1992, at Wembley Stadium.

Charts

Weekly charts

Year-end charts

Certifications

Personnel
 James Hetfield – vocals, lead and rhythm guitars
 Jason Newsted – bass guitar
 Lars Ulrich – drums

Additional personnel
 Michael Kamen – orchestral arrangement
 Bob Rock - production

Alternative versions

"Nothing Else Matters '99"

For its appearance on S&M, its orchestration was arranged by Michael Kamen conducting the San Francisco Symphony Orchestra. This live version is featured on the album S&M. It was also released as the single "Nothing Else Matters '99", which included the b-sides "-Human", and the S&M version of "For Whom the Bell Tolls", on November 22, 1999. This version was also played with guitars tuned to E♭.

Charts

Weekly charts

Year-end charts

"Elevator Version"
There is also an acoustic remix of "Nothing Else Matters" that is called "Elevator Version", with no electric guitars (replaced by acoustic guitars, even for the solo), Kamen's orchestrations, and Hetfield's voice only; it appears as the B-side to "Sad but True".

Jungle Cruise version
An instrumental version of "Nothing Else Matters" appears on the soundtrack of the 2021 film Jungle Cruise. The band collaborated with the film's composer James Newton Howard to record a new orchestral arrangement of the song for the film.

Lucie Silvas version

"Nothing Else Matters" is a special Europe-only single by British singer-songwriter Lucie Silvas. It was released in exactly the same way as "Don't Look Back", with the same B-sides and artwork.

Track listing

Charts

Gregorian version
Gregorian is a German band headed by Frank Peterson that performs Gregorian chant-inspired versions of modern pop and rock songs. In 1999, they recovered their version to be included on their album Masters of Chant.

Miley Cyrus version

On January 7, 2021, it was announced that Miley Cyrus would be releasing a cover version that would feature Elton John on piano, drummer Chad Smith from Red Hot Chili Peppers, current Metallica bassist Robert Trujillo and cellist Yo-Yo Ma. Cyrus also announced in October 2020 that she plans to release a full album of Metallica covers. Cyrus previously covered "Nothing Else Matters" during her 2019 set at Glastonbury. The cover, produced by Andrew Watt, was released on June 22, 2021, as a promotional single from Metallica's tribute album The Metallica Blacklist, released on September 10. The video for this version was uploaded the same day on Cyrus' YouTube channel. The cover is also featured on John's album The Lockdown Sessions, which released on October 22.

Charts

Hardwell mashup
On December 23, 2022, Hardwell released a mashup of "Nothing Else Matters" and his song "F*cking Society", featured on the deluxe edition of his album Rebels Never Die.

Other cover versions
 The Metallica Blacklist features cover versions by a variety of artists, including Cyrus, Phoebe Bridgers, Dave Gahan, Mickey Guyton, Dermot Kennedy, Mon Laferte, Igor Levit, My Morning Jacket, PG Roxette, Darius Rucker, Chris Stapleton and Tresor.
 Today Is the Day recorded a cover version of the song, which was released on the Undecided Records compilation The Old, The New, The Unreleased: Undecided Records Sampler.

References

1990s ballads
1990 songs
1992 singles
1999 singles
Elektra Records singles
Mercury Records singles
Hard rock ballads
Heavy metal ballads
Live singles
Metallica songs
Number-one singles in Denmark
Song recordings produced by Bob Rock
Songs written by James Hetfield
Songs written by Lars Ulrich
American rock songs